Kolodiivka is a Ukrainian place name which can refer to the following villages:
 Kolodiivka, Ivano-Frankivsk Oblast, formerly known in Polish as Kołodziejówka
 Kolodiivka, Khmelnytskyi Oblast
 Kolodiivka, Rivne Oblast 
 Kolodiivka, Ternopil Oblast 
 Kolodiivka, Zhytomyr Oblast